Nicolas Louis François Gosse (2 October 1787 – 9 February 1878) was a French historical painter.

Biography
Gosse was born in Paris, where he studied at the Ecole des Beaux-Arts and under Vincent, and became a skilled representative of the academic style prevailing in his earlier period. His principal works include: Napoleon I and Queen Louise at Tilsit, Meeting of Napoleon and Alexander of Russia at Erfurt, and “Louis Philippe Declining the Crown of Belgium Offered to His Son,” all now housed in the Historical Museum at Versailles; and “Entry of the Duke of Angoulême into Madrid,” a wall painting in the Hôtel de Ville, Paris.

Notes

References

External links

Painters from Paris
1787 births
1878 deaths
Burials at Montmartre Cemetery
École des Beaux-Arts alumni
18th-century French painters
French male painters
19th-century French painters
French male artists
19th-century French male artists
18th-century French male artists